Southern Stars might refer to:

 Southern Stars Club, a Lebanese women's association football club
 Southern Stars FC, an Australian soccer team
 Southern Stars (cricket), a cricket team which played in the Sahara Elite League
 Southern Stars (Rose Tattoo album) by Australian band Rose Tattoo
 The Australia national women's cricket team, nicknamed the Southern Stars

See also 
 Southern Star (disambiguation)